Alligator is a 1980 American independent horror film directed by Lewis Teague and written by John Sayles. It stars Robert Forster, Robin Riker and Michael V. Gazzo. It also includes an appearance by actress Sue Lyon in her last screen role. Set in Chicago, the film follows a police officer and a reptile expert who track an enormous, ravenous man-eating alligator flushed down the toilet years earlier, that is attacking residents after escaping from the city’s sewers.

The film received praise from critics for its intentional satirizing of genre clichés. A direct-to-video sequel was released in 1991, entitled Alligator II: The Mutation. Despite the title, Alligator II shared no characters or actors with the original. A tabletop game based on Alligator was distributed by the Ideal Toy Company in 1980.

Plot
In 1968, a teenage girl purchases a baby American alligator while on vacation with her family at a tourist trap in Florida. When the family returns home to Chicago, the girl's surly, animal-phobic father promptly flushes it down the toilet and into the city's sewers.

The baby alligator survives by feeding on the discarded carcasses of animals used in illegal experimentation and dumped into the sewers. These animals had been used as test subjects for an experimental growth formula intended to increase agricultural livestock meat production. However, the project was abandoned because while the formula had the desired effect of making the animals larger than normal, it had the unwanted side effect of massively increasing the animals' metabolism, causing them to develop an insatiable appetite. During the 12 years spanning 1968 and 1980, the baby alligator bioaccumulates concentrated amounts of this formula from feeding on these carcasses, causing it to mutate and grow into a perpetually ravenous  monster resembling a Deinosuchus-Purussaurus hybrid with an almost-impenetrable hide.

The alligator begins ambushing and devouring sewer workers. The resulting discovery of body parts exiting the sewers draws in world-weary police detective David Madison who, after a horribly botched case in St. Louis, has gained a reputation for being lethally unlucky for his assigned partners. As David works on the case, his boss Chief Clark introduces him to herpetologist Marisa Kendall. Kendall was in fact the teenager who bought the baby alligator in 1968. The two of them edge into a prickly romantic relationship, and during a visit to Kendall’s house, Madison bonds with her motor-mouthed mother.

Madison's reputation as a partner-killer is confirmed when the alligator devours a young officer named Kelly who accompanies Madison into the sewer searching for clues. No one believes Madison’s story due to a lack of a body, and partly because of Slade, the influential local tycoon who sponsored the illegal experiments and therefore wants the truth concealed. This changes when obnoxious tabloid reporter Thomas Kemp, one of the banes of Madison’s existence, goes snooping in the sewers and procures graphic and indisputable photographic evidence of the beast at the involuntary cost of his life. The story quickly garners public attention, and a citywide hunt for the monster is called for.

After the police unsuccessfully attempt to flush out the alligator, Madison is put on suspension. The alligator escapes from the sewers and comes to the surface, first killing a police officer and later a young boy who, during a party, is tossed into a swimming pool in which the alligator sought rest.

The ensuing hunt continues, including the hiring of pompous big-game hunter Colonel Brock to track the animal. Once again, the effort fails: Brock is devoured, the police trip over each other confusedly, and the alligator goes on a rampage through a high-society wedding party hosted at Slade's mansion; among its victims are Slade himself, the mayor, and Slade's chief scientist for the hormone experiments and intended son-in-law. Madison and Kendall finally lure the reptile into the sewers before setting off explosives, killing it. As they walk away, a drainpipe into the sewer spits out another baby alligator, thus potentially repeating the cycle all over again.

Cast

Production
Location shooting took place in and around Los Angeles. Although commentary on the Lions Gate Entertainment DVD gives the location as Chicago, the police vehicles in the film appear to have Missouri license plates. When the young Marisa returns home with her family from their vacation in Florida, they pass a sign that reads "Welcome to Missouri". Later, the voice of a newscaster identifies Marisa as "a native of our city", implying the location is a city in Missouri other than St. Louis. Also the movie states multiple times it takes place in a city in Missouri other than St. Louis. 

Bryan Cranston worked as a special-effects assistant on this film, in charge of making and rigging "the alligator guts" for the film's finale.

Reception
On the review aggregator website Rotten Tomatoes, it holds an 84% approval rating based on 25 reviews, with an average of 6.5/10. On Metacritic, the film has a weighted average score of 62 out of 100 based on 10 reviews, indicating "generally favorable reviews".

Vincent Canby of The New York Times gave the film a mostly positive review, writing that its "suspense is frequently as genuine as its wit and its fond awareness of the clichés [it uses]". The staff of Variety concluded: "Dumb as it is, director Lewis Teague brings some plusses to the pic. Robert Forster, as a detective, and Riker are amiable leads, never taking the film too seriously. Tech credits are cheap but serviceable." Roger Ebert, writing for the Chicago Sun-Times, gave the film one out of four stars, suggesting that it would be best to "flush this movie down the toilet to see if it also grows into something big and fearsome."

In 2000, Kim Newman of Empire praised the perceived wit of the film's script, as well as the "solid performances, effective effects", and "spirited B-level direction". In 2007, Entertainment Weeklys Chris Nashawaty called the film "Clever, funny, and wonderfully bloody," and wrote that "[this] B movie deserves an... 'A-. In 2013, Jim Knipfel of Den of Geek awarded the film four-and-a-half out of five stars, calling it "intelligent and stylish". Film historian Leonard Maltin gave the film a score of three out of four stars, and wrote: "If you've got to make a film about a giant alligator that's terrorizing Chicago, this is the way to do it—with a sense of fun to balance the expected violence and genuine scares."

Alligator, along with films such as Grizzly (1976), Orca (1977) and Piranha (1978), is considered by some to be a "rip-off" film made to capitalize on the success of the film Jaws (1975), whose main antagonist is a man-eating great white shark. John Sayles, who wrote the script for Alligator, also created the screenplay for Piranha two years earlier.

In an interview, filmmaker Quentin Tarantino said that Robert Forster's character, David Madison, inspired the character Max Cherry (also played by Forster) of his 1997 film Jackie Brown.

Sequel

Home media

On September 18, 2007, Lions Gate Entertainment released the film on DVD for the first time in the United States. The disc features a new 16x9 anamorphic widescreen transfer in the original 1.78:1 ratio and a new Dolby Digital 5.1-channel sound mix in addition to the original mono mix. The included extras are a commentary track with director Lewis Teague and star Robert Forster, a featurette titled Alligator Author in which screenwriter John Sayles discusses the differences between his original story and the final screenplay, and the original theatrical trailer.

The film had previously been available on DVD in other territories, including a version released in the United Kingdom in February 2003 by Anchor Bay Entertainment. This release features an optional DTS sound mix, includes the sequel Alligator II: The Mutation (1991) on a second disc, and includes the same Teague-Forster commentary found on the recent Lions Gate U.S. release. The Shout! Factory released a collectors edition of Alligator in the two-disc 4K Ultra HD and Blu-Ray set on February 22, 2022 under their Scream! Factory label.

See also
 List of natural horror films
 Sewer alligator

References

External links

 
 
 
 

1980 films
1980 horror films
1980s monster movies
American independent films
American monster movies
American natural horror films
American satirical films
1980s English-language films
Films about crocodilians
Films based on urban legends
Films directed by Lewis Teague
Films set in Chicago
Films shot in Los Angeles
Giant monster films
Films with screenplays by John Sayles
1980s science fiction horror films
American science fiction horror films
1980 independent films
American exploitation films
American splatter films
1980s American films